Fighter Squadron 22 or VF-22 was an aviation unit of the United States Navy. Originally established as Bombing Fighting Squadron 74A (VBF-74A) on 1 May 1945, it was redesignated VBF-74 on 1 August 1945, redesignated as VF-2B on 15 November 1946, redesignated as VF-22 on 1 September 1948, it was disestablished on 6 June 1958.

Operational history

VBF-74 equipped with F4U-4 Corsairs was assigned to Carrier Air Group 74 (CVBG-74) aboard  on her shakedown cruise to the Caribbean from 7 November 1945 to 2 January 1946.

VF-22 equipped with F2H-2 Banshees was assigned to Carrier Air Group 4 (CVG-4) aboard  for a deployment to Korea and the Western Pacific from 26 April to 4 December 1953. The squadron lost 2 F2H-2s and their pilots during this deployment.

Home port assignments

Aircraft assignment
F4U-4 Corsair
F2H-2 Banshee

See also
History of the United States Navy
List of inactive United States Navy aircraft squadrons
List of United States Navy aircraft squadrons

References

External links

Strike fighter squadrons of the United States Navy